J. Allan Soares is a retired American ice hockey player and coach who spent more than 15 years involved with Brown. After starring for the bears as a defenseman, Soares coached the freshman for seven seasons before replacing his former head coach James Fullerton in 1970. he left after 1974 to pursue a career in business but later coached Roger Williams College.

Head coaching record

References

External links

American men's ice hockey defensemen
Brown Bears men's ice hockey coaches
Brown Bears men's ice hockey players
Ice hockey coaches from Rhode Island
Living people
Sportspeople from Cranston, Rhode Island
Year of birth missing (living people)
Ice hockey players from Rhode Island